Rinto Ali (born 2 March 1989) is an Indonesian professional footballer. His usual position is as a midfielder, but also occasionally plays in full-back.

Club career

Persija Jakarta
He was signed for Persija Jakarta to play in Liga 1 in the 2020 season.

Cilegon United (loan)
He was signed for Cilegon United to play in the Liga 2 in the 2020 season, on loan from Persija Jakarta. This season was suspended on 27 March 2020 due to the COVID-19 pandemic. The season was abandoned and was declared void on 20 January 2021.

Badak Lampung
In 2021, Rinto Ali signed a contract with Indonesian Liga 2 club Badak Lampung. He made his league debut on 1 November 2021 in a match against Persekat Tegal at the Gelora Bung Karno Madya Stadium, Jakarta.

Honours

Club 
Pelita Jaya U-21
 Indonesia Super League U-21: 2008–09; runner-up 2009–10

References

External links
 Rinto Ali at Soccerway
 Rinto Ali at Liga Indonesia

1989 births
Living people
Indonesian footballers
Persija Jakarta players
Association football midfielders
People from Ternate
Sportspeople from North Maluku